Poovar is a tourist town in Neyyattinkara (tehsil) in the Thiruvananthapuram district of Kerala state, South India. This village is almost at the southern tip of Thiruvananthapuram while the next village, Pozhiyoor, marks the end of Kerala.

Geography
Poovar lies very close to Vizhinjam, a natural harbour. The beach of Pozhiyoor named Pozhikkara is located near Poovar. The 56 km Neyyar River passes through Neyyattinkara Taluk into the Arabian Sea near Poovar.

History
Poovar was a trading centre of timber, sandalwood, ivory and spices. It is believed that ships owned by King Solomon of Israel landed in Ophir, which is identified by some sources as Poovar,
The village was one of the ancient Muslim settlements along the western coast of India. The central mosque in Poovar was built by Malik Deenar, an eighth century Muslim preacher. During the reign of the Chola dynasty, Poovar was a major port. The explorer Megasthenes, Roman writer Pliny the Elder and Venetian traveller Marco Polo mention connections with Greece and Rome.

The origin of the name "Poovar" has a story related to Marthanda Varma. Before that it was called Pokkumoosapuram. 
There were a merchant named Pokku Moosa Maraikkar who lived in Poovar during the 18th century in a house called Kallaraickal Tharavad, which many times gave shelter to Marthanda Varma (1706–58), king of Travancore from his enemies. Poovar also had trade relations with international markets at this time as well as a well trained army and some ships. At the Battle of Colachel and Battle of Kayamkulam these forces assisted the Travancore army against the Dutch East India Company during the Travancore–Dutch War.

During internal riots in Travancore and while escaping from the Ettuveetil Pillamar (Lords of the Eight Houses), the king reached Poovar. It was a spring season and the trees on either sides of the Neyyar were full of flowers. These flowers fell into the river making it more attractive. On seeing this pleasant scenery, Marthanda Varma commented that this was poo-var, a conjunction of the Malayalam words for "flower" and "river".

References

External links

Poovar Travel Guide

History of Kerala
Tourist attractions in Thiruvananthapuram district
Villages in Thiruvananthapuram district
Beaches of Kerala
Populated coastal places in India
Ophir